MV Lady Martha is a high speed catamaran ferry operated by Hy-Line Cruises out of Hyannis, Massachusetts.

Lady Martha was built by Gladding-Hearn Shipbuilding and was delivered as Grey Lady II in 1997, the second vessel of the name to operate for Hy-Line between Hyannis and Nantucket Island. She was leased to an operator on the US West Coast for several years before returning to Hy-Line in 2005 to operate between Hyannis and Oak Bluffs on Martha's Vineyard, receiving interior modifications and new engines before entering service.

References

Ferries of Massachusetts
Ships built in Somerset, Massachusetts
1997 ships